Ben or Benjamin Stewart may refer to:

 Ben Stewart, Canadian politician
 Benjamin F. Stewart (1851–?), U.S. Army soldier and Medal of Honor recipient
 Benjamin Stewart (dancer), dancer with the San Francisco Ballet
 Ben Stewart (Blue Heelers), a character on the Australian television program Blue Heelers, played by Paul Bishop
 Benjamin D. Stewart (1878–1976), American mining engineer and politician, signer of the constitution of Alaska
 Mount Ben Stewart, a  mountain on Douglas Island, Juneau, Alaska and the island's highest point, named for Benjamin D. Stewart

See also
 James Benjamin Stewart (1978- ), Karate and Kickboxing Champion; Entrepreneur and Motivational Speaker
 John Benjamin Stewart (1924–2015), Canadian politician